KHKA (1500 kHz) is a commercial AM radio station in Honolulu, Hawaii, branded as CBS 1500. The station is owned by Blow Up, LLC and it broadcasts a sports radio format, mostly from CBS Sports Radio.  It also carries some news programs from KHON-TV's Hawaii News Now and CBS Radio News. KHKA is an official radio partner of the University of Hawaiʻi Rainbow Warriors sports and carries local high school sports, as well as San Francisco 49ers football games and San Francisco Giants baseball games.

KHKA is powered at 5,000 watts, using a non-directional antenna. The transmitter is off Nimitz Highway in Honolulu, near Kakauiki Village.  KHKA is also heard on 99-watt FM translator K272GC at 102.3 MHz.  And it retransmits on Oceanic Spectrum digital channel 885 for the entire state of Hawaii.

History
The original call sign was KUMU. In 1967, it added an FM sister station. KUMU-FM 94.7 MHz. For much of the 1960s, 70s and 80s, the two stations aired a beautiful music format. They played quarter-hour sweeps of mostly instrumental cover versions of popular adult hits as well as Broadway and Hollywood show tunes. In the 1990s, to appeal to a younger audience, the stations added more soft vocals and reduced the instrumental music. 

In the early 2000s, KUMU had an adult standards format. A few years later, it flipped to sports talk as a network affiliate of Sporting News Radio. In 2010, KUMU-AM once again became a simulcast of KUMU-FM, airing its Rhythmic Adult Contemporary format.  

On August 2, 2010, Ohana Broadcast Company, LLC, sold KUMU 1500 to Blow Up, LLC, for $250,000. On September 30, 2010, the call sign was changed to KHKA and it returned to a sports talk format. In April 2013, KHKA rebranded as NBC Sports Radio 1500 AM.

On January 1, 2019, KHKA became an affiliate of CBS Sports Radio as a result of NBC Sports Radio discontinuing its full-time network programming. By May 2020, KHKA rebranded as "CBS 1500" as it added programming from CBS News Radio and Hawaii News Now to the lineup while retaining CBS Sports Radio programs.

References

External links
FCC History Cards for KHKA
CBS 1500 website

CBS Sports Radio stations
HKA
Sports radio stations in the United States
Radio stations established in 1963
1963 establishments in Hawaii